Mishukovo is the name of several rural localities in Russia.

Mishukovo, Chuvash Republic, a selo in Mishukovskoye Rural Settlement of Poretsky District in the Chuvash Republic
Mishukovo, Leningrad Oblast, a village in Shugozerskoye Settlement Municipal Formation of Tikhvinsky District in Leningrad Oblast
Mishukovo, Dmitrovsky District, Moscow Oblast, a village in Kulikovskoye Rural Settlement of Dmitrovsky District in Moscow Oblast
Mishukovo, Noginsky District, Moscow Oblast, a village in Yamkinskoye Rural Settlement of Noginsky District in Moscow Oblast
Mishukovo, Murmansk Oblast, an inhabited locality in Mezhdurechensky Territorial Okrug of Kolsky District in Murmansk Oblast
Mishukovo, Nizhny Novgorod Oblast, a selo in Yuryevsky Selsoviet of Gaginsky District in Nizhny Novgorod Oblast
Mishukovo, Ryazan Oblast, a village in Savostyanovsky Rural Okrug of Kasimovsky District in Ryazan Oblast
Mishukovo, Smolensk Oblast, a village in Malyshevskoye Rural Settlement of Yelninsky District in Smolensk Oblast
Mishukovo, Tver Oblast, a village in Molodotudskoye Rural Settlement of Oleninsky District in Tver Oblast
Mishukovo, Vologda Oblast, a village in Vozhbalsky Selsoviet of Totemsky District in Vologda Oblast
Mishukovo, Yaroslavl Oblast, a village in Pestretsovsky Rural Okrug of Yaroslavsky District in Yaroslavl Oblast